"The Illest" is a song by American hip hop group Far East Movement. The song was co-written and produced by Norwegian music producer and songwriter Axident and Wallpaper. aka Ricky Reed, and features a guest appearance from American rapper Riff Raff. It was released digitally as a single on July 2, 2013 and has since peaked at number 18 on the US Billboard Hot Rap Songs. "The Illest" was featured as a bonus track and a single from the 2013 Special Edition release of their fourth studio album Dirty Bass (becoming the album's fifth single overall).

Background 
"The Illest" was originally featured on Far East Movement released a mixtape titled GRZZLY that was released on May 29, 2013. Then a few days later the group released a new version of the song, now featuring rapper Riff Raff. On July 2, 2013, the new version was released for digital download as a single by Cherrytree Records and Interscope Records. Far East Movement then created a Tumblr titled FuckYeahIllest to help promote the song. The song was then featured on their EP Murder Was the Bass, which was released on December 9, 2013. They also have said the song would be featured on their upcoming fifth studio album.

Music video 
The music video was directed by Mike Clattenburg and filmed at Los Angeles Center Studios. It was released on July 23, 2013, with an cameo appearance by  Hugh Jackman. It features a blindingly dull office getting raided and destroyed by Far East Movement and Riff Raff, in a manner that nods to Office Space and Workaholics. Additionally the music video features cameo appearances from Lil Debbie, Dumbfoundead, Jeffree Star, Nice Peter, Watsky among other popular YouTube personalities.

A second music video was released on April 15, 2014 in support of their Ktown Riot EP. The video was inspired by the Koreatown riots of 1992. Snoop Dogg makes a cameo appearance, as well as Los Angeles / Koreatown residents Tokimonsta. Riff Raff is also seen performing his verse.

A video was also made using a mash-up of the Deorro and Victor Niglio remixes. It was published to YouTube through the group's Vevo channel on December 10, 2013, and features scenes from The Illest Tour.

Remix 
On March 4, 2014, the official remix, mixed by DJ Eman, was released. The remix features guest appearances by Schoolboy Q and B.o.B, as well as Riff Raff's verse from the original. On April 16, 2014, an alternate version of the song, featuring a slightly altered arrangement and vocals from Schoolboy Q, was released as a digital download. This version was included as the lead track on their late-2014 EP Ktown Riot.

Track listing

Credits and personnel 
Lead vocals – Far East Movement
Producers – Axident, Wallpaper.
Writers – A. Schuller, R. Reed, K. Nishimura, J. Roh, J. Choung, V. Coquia, J. Christian
Label: Cherrytree Records / Interscope Records

Chart performance

Release history

References 

2013 singles
2014 singles
2013 songs
Far East Movement songs
Cherrytree Records singles
Interscope Records singles
Songs written by Axident
Songs written by Ricky Reed
Songs written for films
Songs written by Schoolboy Q
Songs written by B.o.B